Kilmalkedar is a medieval ecclesiastical site and National Monument located in County Kerry, Ireland.

Location 

History 
Kilmalkedar is traditionally associated with Saint Brendan (c. AD 484 – c. 577), but also with a local saint, Maolcethair (Maol Céadair, Maol Céaltair, Malkedar; died 636).

The surviving church dates to the mid-12th century, with the chancel extended c. 1200.

It was a traditional assembly site for pilgrims, who followed the Saint's Road (Casán na Naomh) northeast to Mount Brandon.

Some of the rituals carried out by locals, like performing nine clockwise circuits of the site on Easter Sunday, or the boring of holes in standing stones, suggest remnants of Celtic religion; Kilmalkedar may well have been a religious site long before Christianity arrived.

Buildings 

The church resembles Cormac's Chapel on the Rock of Cashel (built 1127–1134). The chancel is  externally. The doorway is a notable Hiberno-Romanesque piece. A hole in the east wall of the chancel is called "the eye of the needle"; if one can fit through it, one is certain to go to heaven.

Pre-Romanesque remains include a corbelled building, perhaps a monastic cell; an alphabet stone; an Ogham stone; a sundial; a stone cross; and some bullauns. One of the bullauns is associated with the mythical cow Glas Gaibhnenn.

The alphabet stone is carved with "DNI" (domini) and the Latin alphabet in uncial script, carved c. AD 550–600.

The Ogham stone (CIIC 187) reads ẠṆM MẠỊLE-INBIR/ MACI BROCANN ("Name of Máel-Inbher son of Broccán") and dates to c. AD 600.

References 

Christian monasteries in the Republic of Ireland
Religion in County Kerry
Archaeological sites in County Kerry
National Monuments in County Kerry
Ogham inscriptions